Pokrzywna may refer to the following places:
Pokrzywna, Łódź Voivodeship (central Poland)
Pokrzywna, Masovian Voivodeship (east-central Poland)
Pokrzywna, Opole Voivodeship (south-west Poland)